Elmar Bakhshiev (born 3 August 1980) is an Azerbaijani football manager and former footballer. Bakhshiev played as a midfielder, and currently manages Gabala FK.

Career
On 19 January 2012 Bakhshiev signed an initial one-year contract with Gabala. On 25 March 2014. Bakhshiev announced that he would be retiring at the end of the 2013–14 season.

Career statistics

Club

International

Statistics accurate as of match played 9 June 2009

Career honours

Club
Khazar Lankaran
Azerbaijan Cup: 2007–08

Neftchi Baku
Azerbaijan Premier League: 2010–11

References

External links
 
 

1980 births
Living people
Azerbaijani footballers
Azerbaijan international footballers
Association football midfielders
Azerbaijan Premier League players
Shamakhi FK players
Gabala FC players
Neftçi PFK players